Lazar Sajčić (born 24 September 1996) is a Serbian footballer.

Career
Born in Belgrade, Sajčić passed Partizan youth school, and later spent 2 seasons with Teleoptik. He scored 18 goals for the 2014–15 season including 4 in a match against Hajduk Beograd and was the best scorer of Serbian League Belgrade. After a half-season with Sinđelić Beograd, Sajčić joined Jagodina for the spring half of 2015–16 season. Later, same year, Sajčić moved in Borac Čačak.

References

External links
 
 Lazar Sajčić stats at utakmica.rs 
 
 

1996 births
Living people
Footballers from Belgrade
Association football forwards
Serbian footballers
Serbian First League players
Serbian SuperLiga players
FK Teleoptik players
FK Sinđelić Beograd players
FK Jagodina players
FK Borac Čačak players
SK Dynamo České Budějovice players
FC Gorodeya players
FC Gomel players
FC Atyrau players
FC Hegelmann players
Serbian expatriate footballers
Expatriate footballers in the Czech Republic
Expatriate footballers in Belarus
Expatriate footballers in Kazakhstan
Serbian expatriate sportspeople in Belarus
Serbian expatriate sportspeople in the Czech Republic
Serbian expatriate sportspeople in Kazakhstan
Expatriate footballers in Lithuania